Stephanie Obermoser (born 14 October 1988) is an Austrian sports shooter. She competed in the Women's 10 metre air rifle and women's 50 metre rifle three positions events at the 2012 Summer Olympics.

References

External links
 

1988 births
Living people
Austrian female sport shooters
Olympic shooters of Austria
Shooters at the 2012 Summer Olympics
People from Kitzbühel District
European Games competitors for Austria
Shooters at the 2015 European Games
Sportspeople from Tyrol (state)
21st-century Austrian women